Just Like in the Movies (Spanish: Como en el cine) is a 2015 Peruvian comedy film, written and directed by Gonzalo Ladines, one of the creators of Los Cinéfilos, in his directorial debut. The film was selected as the Peruvian representative to compete in the Best Ibero-American Film category at the 31st Goya Awards, but was not nominated.

Synopsis 
After learning that his girlfriend took him out on his own “Star Wars” sheets, Nico decides to rediscover his true love: the movies. For this mission, he brings together his old classmates, with whom he tries to make a very low-budget short film. Together they live absurd situations, between reality and fiction, that lead them to question their friendship and the direction of their lives.

Cast 

 Manuel Gold as Nico
 Pietro Sibille as Rolo
 Andres Salas as Bruno
 Gisela Ponce de León as Dani

Production 
The filming of the film lasted a month and began in Lima at the end of April 2015.

Release and reception 
Just Like in the Movies premiered in Peruvian theaters on November 12, 2015. The film brought 76 thousand viewers to the cinema in its first weekend in theaters. At the end of the year, it brought 227,714 thousand viewers to the cinema, becoming the fourth best national premiere of 2015.

References

External links 

 

2015 films
2015 comedy films
Peruvian comedy films
2010s Peruvian films
2010s Spanish-language films

Films set in Peru
Films shot in Peru
Films about friendship
Films about cinematography
2015 directorial debut films